Prairie High School may refer to one of these North American schools:

Prairie High School (Alberta), in Three hills, Alberta, Canada
Prairie High School (Idaho), in Cottonwood, Idaho, United States
Prairie High School (Washington), in Brush Prairie (Vancouver), Washington, United States
The Prairie School, in Racine, Wisconsin, United States
Prairie High School (Iowa), in Cedar Rapids, Iowa, United States